is  the assistant coach of the Kawasaki Brave Thunders in the Japanese B.League.

Head coaching record

|- 
| style="text-align:left;"|Iwate Big Bulls
| style="text-align:left;"|2015-16
| 52||30||22|||| style="text-align:center;"|5th in Bj Eastern|||4||2||2||
| style="text-align:center;"|Lost in second round
|-
| style="text-align:left;"|Sun Rockers Shibuya
| style="text-align:left;"|2017-18
|60||28||32|||| style="text-align:center;"|5th in Eastern|||-||-||-||
| style="text-align:center;"|-
|-
| style="text-align:left;"|Sun Rockers Shibuya
| style="text-align:left;"|2018-19
|8||1||7|||| style="text-align:center;"| Fired|||-||-||-||
| style="text-align:center;"|-
|-

References

1981 births
Living people
Iwate Big Bulls coaches
Japanese basketball coaches
Kawasaki Brave Thunders coaches
Santa Clara University alumni
Sun Rockers Shibuya coaches